Ordsall may refer to more than one place in England:

Ordsall, Greater Manchester
Ordsall (ward), an electoral ward of the Salford City Council
Ordsall Hall
Ordsall, Nottinghamshire
Ordsall Hall School